The Hackney South by-election was a Parliamentary by-election held on 24 May 1912. The constituency returned one Member of Parliament (MP) to the House of Commons of the United Kingdom, elected by the first past the post voting system.

Vacancy
In May 1912, Horatio Bottomley, the controversial Liberal MP for Hackney South, was forced resign his seat when he was declared bankrupt. Bottomley had been unpopular with a large portion of the party's activists in Hackney, who had run their own candidate against him in December 1910.

Electoral history

Candidates
The two Liberal factions came together to nominate Hector Morison for the vacancy. Morison was a 62-year-old Scottish member of the London Stock Exchange. He was also a former Member of Parliament, he had sat for Eastbourne from January to December 1910, when he was defeated.

The Unionists selected John Constant Gibson, a 51-year-old Scottish businessman.

Result

Henri was the endorsed candidate of the Coalition Government.

Aftermath
Morison served only one term as a member of the Commons. He chose to retire at the next general election in 1918. Horatio Bottomley, whose bankruptcy had been annulled, regained the Hackney South seat as an independent though he would later be expelled again, leading to the 1922 Hackney South by-election.

References

Hackney South,1912
Hackney South,1912
Hackney South by-election
Hackney South by-election
Hackney South by-election